Shoja Azari is an Iranian-born visual artist and filmmaker based in New York City. He is known for his films and multimedia installations.

Early life and education
Azari was born in Shiraz, Iran. Azari trained as a filmmaker in New York in the 1970s before returning to Iran during the Iranian Revolution in 1979. He then permanently returned to the U.S. In 1997, he first met artist Shirin Neshat when she was assembling a team to create her first video, “Turbulent”. Azari and Neshat became artistic and romantic partners. He is divorced and has one son, Johnny B. Azari, a musician.

Film
Azari is known for films such as Women Without Men (2009), Windows (2006), and K (2002). These were based on three of Franz Kafka's short stories: "The Married Couple", "In the Penal Colony", and "A Fratricide", respectively. He co-directed with Neshat the film Land of Dreams (2021), which won  the Golden Peacock Award at the 52nd International Film Festival of India.

Multimedia installations and art
According to Carol Kino of The New York Times, Azari's "multimedia installations have been increasingly showcased in galleries and museums around the world." His first solo exhibition in New York occurred in 2010 at the Leila Taghinia-Milani Heller Gallery. His video installation work, Idyllic Life (2012), was part of the exhibition In the Fields of Empty Days: The Intersection of Past and Present in Iranian Art (2018) at the Los Angeles County Museum of Art.

See also
 Iranian modern and contemporary art
 List of Iranian Americans
 List of Iranian artists

References

External links
 Shoja Azari at the Leila Heller Gallery

1957 births
Living people
Iranian contemporary artists
Iranian film directors
Iranian emigrants to the United States